Lisa Tucker may refer to:

Lisa Tucker (author), American author who is credited for three novels in young adult and adult fiction, active 2003–present
Lisa Tucker (singer) (born 1989), American singer, musical theater actress, and television actress